BMARC is an acronym for the now-defunct British Manufacture and Research Company.

BMARC may also refer to:

Bulgarian Macedono-Adrianopolitan Revolutionary Committee, another name for the Internal Macedonian Revolutionary Organization